Lingyang Town is an urban town and the seat of Cili County, Hunan, China.

Administrative division
The town is divided into 57 villages and 15 community, the following areas: 
 
  Nanjie Community
  Dongjie Community
  Beijie Community
  Xijie Community
  Zixia Community
  Baishajing Community
  Chaowangta Community
  Liyuqiao Community
  Baiyun Community
  Tongtai Community
  Jintai Community
  Taiping Community
  Beigang Community
  Longping Community
  Baigongcheng Community
  Pipa Village
  Longfeng Village
  Bijia Village
  Lingxi Village
  Shiban Village
  Minhe Village
  Zhongxin Village
  Baizhushui Village
  Renhe Village
  Yunpan Village
  Liangxi Village
  Qicong Village
  Shuiwang Village
  Qingshan Village
  Baishaxi Village
  Jinhua Village
  Shima Village
  Haojiashan Village
  Changqing Village
  Tongxin Village
  Yong'an Village
  Tianxing Village
  Fengyang Village
  Zengshan Village
  Cha'an Village
  Baolian Village
  Luping Village
  Chenxiyu Village
  Baizhupo Village
  Fenggang Village
  Liulin Village
  Baiyang Village
  Tieqiao Village
  Tuanxi Village
  xingfu Village
  Chenjiashan Village
  Liangya Village
  Tuanpo Village
  Moyan Village
  Qixiangping Village
  Nanyang Village
  Sangmuxi Village
  Jinlong Village
  Daxing Village
  Changtanhe Village
  Yanluo Village
  Yajing Village
  Changjian Village
  Lishan Village
  Nanzhu Village
  Shengli Village
  Kexi Village
  Dashaxi Village
  Xingyan Village
  Bamao Village
  Yintian Village
  Fengya Village
  Xianyuanyichang

References

Divisions of Cili County
County seats in Hunan